Prépotin is a former commune in the Orne department (region of Normandy) in north-western France. On 1 January 2016, it was merged into the new commune of Tourouvre au Perche. It belongs to the canton of Tourouvre and the arrondissement of Mortagne-au-Perche. Prépotin had 120 inhabitants in 2019. It sits at an altitude of 263 meters.

See also
Communes of the Orne department

References

Former communes of Orne